Jim Hostler (born May 5, 1966) is an American football coach who is an offensive assistant for the Detroit Lions of the National Football League (NFL).  Previously he served as an assistant coach for the Washington Commanders of the National Football League (NFL). He was one of several Carolina Panthers coaches to move to Washington after the 2019 season. He also was the offensive coordinator of the San Francisco 49ers in 2007. He spent the 2005 and 2006 seasons as the 49ers' quarterbacks coach. As a member of the Baltimore Ravens' coaching staff, Hostler won his first Super Bowl title when the team defeated the San Francisco 49ers in Super Bowl XLVII. He had previously served on the staffs of the New York Jets, the New Orleans Saints, and the Kansas City Chiefs. Prior to coaching in the NFL, Hostler spent nine seasons coaching at Indiana University of Pennsylvania (IUP), his alma mater, where he had played cornerback for four seasons.

References

External links
Washington Commanders profile

1966 births
Living people
American football cornerbacks
Baltimore Ravens coaches
Carolina Panthers coaches
IUP Crimson Hawks football coaches
IUP Crimson Hawks football players
Juniata Eagles football coaches
Kansas City Chiefs coaches
New Orleans Saints coaches
New York Jets coaches
San Francisco 49ers coaches
National Football League offensive coordinators
People from Bethel Park, Pennsylvania
Players of American football from Pennsylvania
Washington Football Team coaches